KBZI (100.7 FM) was a radio station broadcasting a hot adult contemporary format. Previously licensed to Deerfield, Missouri, it served Pittsburg, Kansas area. The station was owned by American Media Investments, and was branded as B100.7 until May 2008.

In February 2009, the KBZI format was set to move to 107.1 FM so that its signal would better serve the southern part of the Pittsburg market and the nearby Joplin, Missouri market. However, this severely weakened its signal in the northern part of the market, 100.7's primary coverage area, making it more difficult to pick it up in Fort Scott and Nevada, where it had a significant following. The switch was delayed due to high winds, which prevented workers from installing the transmitter on its new tower, which kept the station off the air for three days.

A few days later, it was rumored that the 107.1 BZI experiment had already been killed and the 107.1 frequency was restored to the format it had been carrying before the switch. Confirmation of this has not yet been made by anyone involved with the station. The KBZI callsign remained on the 107.1 FM frequency until November 16, 2009, when the call sign was changed back to KJML. 100.7 was reactivated as KSHQ in 2013.

BZI
Defunct radio stations in the United States
Radio stations established in 2000
Radio stations disestablished in 2009
2000 establishments in Missouri
2009 disestablishments in Missouri
BZI